The Motorola i1 is an Internet-enabled smartphone by Motorola, running the Android operating system designed by Google. It was the first Android smartphone for iDEN-based networks, which use older 2G technology rather than modern CDMA and GSM networks, and only support data rates up to 19.2 kbps. The Motorola i1 also uses Wi-Fi to access the Internet at higher speeds.

It was announced on March 23, 2010, and launched with Boost Mobile in the US on June 20, 2010, for a retail price of $350 without a contract.

The Motorola i1 is available in the United States for Boost Mobile, Sprint Nextel and SouthernLINC, in Canada for Telus (Mike) and in Mexico and other Latin American countries for Nextel.

See also
 List of Android devices
 Android (operating system)
 Galaxy Nexus

References

Mobile phones introduced in 2010
Android (operating system) devices
Linux-based devices
Motorola smartphones
Touchscreen portable media players